Saint Baldwin may refer to:

 (d. 679), archdeacon of Laon
Baldwin of Rieti (d. 1140), Benedictine abbot
 (d. 1205), Benedictine abbot